Trindon Jerard Holliday (born April 27, 1986) is a former American football wide receiver and return specialist. He was drafted by the Houston Texans in the sixth round of the 2010 NFL draft. He played college football at LSU. 
At 5'5", Holliday is one of the shortest players in NFL history. He has also played for the Denver Broncos, New York Giants, Tampa Bay Buccaneers, San Francisco 49ers, and Oakland Raiders.

High school career
Holliday went both ways at Northeast High, in Pride, Louisiana. Because of his short stature, Holliday did not start on the football team until his junior year. In his first season starting, he rushed for 1,870 yards and scored 26 touchdowns. In his senior year, Holliday put up even better statistics by rushing for 2,210 yards, scoring 34 touchdowns, and averaging 27.6 yards per punt return.

Holliday was also a track runner in high school. In 2005, Holliday posted the nation’s fastest indoor time in the 55 and 60-meter dashes. He led his team into the 2A state title by winning the 100 meters and 200 meters and was second in the long jump. Holliday was a four-time state champion in the 200 meters and a three-time 100 meters champion.

College career

Football
Holliday played football for the LSU Tigers football team from 2006–2009. In that time, he recorded eight touchdowns: four rushing, two on punt returns and two on kick returns.

Track and field
Holliday was a top-ranked American sprinter competing for the LSU Tigers track and field team and is regarded as one of the fastest players in football. He demonstrated his sprinting ability in the 100-meter dash at the 2007 USA Outdoor Track and Field Championships, where he recorded 10.07 seconds in the final – ahead of Walter Dix and second only to Tyson Gay. This qualified him for the 2007 World Championships in Athletics but he opted to not compete, preferring to begin the football season with the LSU Tigers. He continued to race, however, and reached the semi-finals in the 100 m at the 2008 United States Olympic Trials the following year.

In his first year at LSU in 2007, he broke Xavier Carter's school record and became the Southeastern Conference 100 m champion. At the NCAA Outdoor Track and Field Championship later that year he set a personal record in the semifinals and finished runner-up in the final to Walter Dix. The following year, he took third in the 100 m NCAA final and anchored the 4×100-meter relay team to victory in 38.42 seconds – the fastest collegiate time that year.

Track and Field News has Holliday recorded at 6.19 over 55 meters indoors in 2005, leading the nation.

Personal records

Professional career

2010 NFL Draft
Leading up to the 2010 NFL Scouting Combine, Trindon Holliday had hoped to break Chris Johnson's record mark of 4.24 in the 40-yard dash. Holliday had self-reported running times as fast as 4.21, which seemed plausible given his extensive track background, and the fastest 100 m dash time of any football player in NCAA history. At the combine, reports of Holliday's 40-yard dash time ranged from between 4.18 seconds and 4.34 seconds. Adam Schefter, an ESPN reporter on hand at the event, had reported on Twitter that NFL scouts had clocked Holliday in as low as 4.21 during the workout. However, the NFL Network broadcast team record Holliday's two tries at unofficial times of 4.27 and 4.32, respectively, and ultimately published it as 4.34 seconds officially.

Houston Texans

Holliday was drafted by the Houston Texans in the 6th round of the 2010 draft. Despite his speed, Holliday struggled on kickoff returns in the preseason. He was placed on IR because of a fracture in his thumb. On September 3, 2011, he was cut and then placed on the practice squad. On October 5, his practice squad contract was terminated and he was later added to the active roster, but was waived on October 25. He was later resigned and in Week 1 of the 2012 preseason versus the Carolina Panthers, he returned a kickoff return for a touchdown. The next week versus the San Francisco 49ers, he returned a punt for a touchdown. In the final preseason game versus the Minnesota Vikings, Holliday recorded his third touchdown in four games; this touchdown was a 76-yard punt return. Following the 2012 preseason, Holliday made the Houston Texans 53-man roster and was the starting punt and kick returner. Holliday was waived from the Texans on October 10, 2012, in a move to bolster an injury-depleted defense. Part of the reason Holliday was released was due to his fumbling problems. Trindon fumbled the ball 6 times in 2012, however losing only one of them.

Denver Broncos
On October 11, 2012, Holliday was claimed off of waivers by the Denver Broncos. On October 15, in his first game as a Bronco, Holliday fumbled and lost the ball on a punt return in the first quarter of the game. He returned a kickoff 105 yards for a touchdown against the Cincinnati Bengals on November 4, 2012, breaking the Broncos record for the longest play. On November 11, 2012, he returned a Carolina Panthers punt for 76 yards. The play was ruled a touchdown despite his fumbling of the ball on the 1 yard line.  In 2012, Holliday's teams went undefeated during the regular season.  He started the season with the Texans who were 5-0 when they cut him.  He was then acquired by the Broncos who finished the regular season 13-3 with an 11-game win streak.

On January 12, 2013, Holliday returned a punt in the first quarter of the game versus the Baltimore Ravens for a 90-yard touchdown, the longest punt return in postseason history. On the opening kickoff of the second half, he returned a kickoff for a 104-yard touchdown. He became the first player in NFL history with a punt return touchdown and a kick return touchdown in the same postseason game. He had 256 total punt and kick return yards but the Broncos lost, 38-35 in double overtime.

In the 2013 season, Holliday returned a punt 81 yards for a touchdown in week 2 against the New York Giants. He also returned a kick-off 105 yards for a touchdown in week 4 against the Philadelphia Eagles.

's NFL off-season, Trindon Holliday held at least 11 Broncos franchise records, including:
 Kick Ret Yds: playoff game (158 on 2013-01-12 BAL)
 Yds/KR: career (29.05), playoffs (28.67), playoff game (52.67 on 2013-01-12 BAL)
 Kick Ret TDs: career (2; with Goldie Sellers), playoff career/season/game (1 on 2013-01-12 BAL)
 Punt Returns: game (8 on 2012-11-11 @CAR; with Rick Upchurch)
 Punt Ret Yds: playoff game (90 on 2013-01-12 BAL)
 Yds/PR: playoff game (30 on 2013-01-12 BAL)
 Punt Ret TDs: playoff career/season/game (1 on 2013-01-12 BAL)
 Total Return Yds: playoff game (248 on 2013-01-12 BAL)
 Total Return TDs: career (4), playoff career/season/game (2 on 2013-01-12 BAL, also NFL record)

New York Giants
On March 17, 2014, Holliday signed a one-year contract with the New York Giants. He was released on October 6, 2014.

Tampa Bay Buccaneers
Holliday signed with the Tampa Bay Buccaneers on October 21, 2014. He was waived/injured on October 31, 2014.

San Francisco 49ers
On December 26, 2014, the San Francisco 49ers signed Holliday. He was released on April 30, 2015.

Oakland Raiders
On June 3, 2015, the Oakland Raiders signed Holliday.  He was expected to compete with T. J. Carrie for the No. 1 returner job for the Raiders. On September 1, 2015, he was released by the Raiders.

Issues with size

At 5'5" (1.65 m), Holliday is the shortest player to play in the NFL in the last 25 years. Holliday had a difficult time getting started in football. His mother held him out of football until 7th grade, because she was afraid he would be injured. After several years of performing at a high level, his high school coaches finally let him start as a running back during his junior year. In his senior year he accumulated over 2,000 yards and over 30 touchdowns, leading Northeast High to back-to-back State Semi-Final appearances.

Fearing that college recruiters would not believe Holliday's actual running times, his high school coaches added to his recorded times before sending them in. Despite his speed records, several schools, including Duke and Louisiana-Lafayette, rejected Holliday due to his small size.

Holliday was never scheduled to appear at LSU's camp. So David Masterson, Holliday's high school coach, took Holliday along also. After initial workouts, Holliday ran the 40 in 4.28 seconds wearing high top basketball shoes. The time was so outrageous that the LSU coaches began arguing if they had started their stopwatches on time. "They asked me if Trindon could run it again," Masterson said. "He didn't even get in a track stance. He ran the second 40 in 4.27. He's one of those little freaks of nature." Despite this, LSU coach Les Miles still considered canceling Holliday's scholarship offer until holdover offensive coordinator Jimbo Fisher convinced Miles that Holliday could play at a college level.

References

External links
 New York Giants bio
 Denver Broncos bio
 LSU Tigers bio
 

1986 births
Living people
American football return specialists
American football wide receivers
American male sprinters
Denver Broncos players
Houston Texans players
LSU Tigers football players
LSU Tigers track and field athletes
New York Giants players
Oakland Raiders players
People from Zachary, Louisiana
Players of American football from Louisiana
San Francisco 49ers players
Tampa Bay Buccaneers players
Track and field athletes from Louisiana
Track and field athletes in the National Football League
Sportspeople from East Baton Rouge Parish, Louisiana